Damlalı can refer to:

 Damlalı, Burhaniye
 Damlalı, Tufanbeyli